Amina Vladikovna Anshba (born 9 September 1999) is a Russian tennis player.

Anshba has career-high WTA rankings of 278 in singles and 115 in doubles, achieved August 2021 and August 2022, respectively. She has won five singles and 22 doubles titles on the ITF Circuit.

Career
Anshba won her biggest title at the 2019 Reinert Open in Versmold, Germany in the doubles event, partnering Anastasia Dețiuc.

Partnering Panna Udvardy, she was runner up at Palermo Open, which is her best doubles result on the WTA Tour. They were defeated by the defending champion Kimberley Zimmermann, who played alongside Anna Bondar.

WTA career finals

Doubles: 1 (runner-up)

ITF Circuit finals

Singles: 15 (5 titles, 10 runner-ups)

Doubles: 40 (22 titles, 18 runner-ups)

Notes

References

External links
 
 

1999 births
Living people
Russian female tennis players
Russian people of Abkhazian descent